M. P. Periyasaamy Thooran (Tamil: பெரியசாமி தூரன்) (26 September 1908 – 20 January 1987) was a patriot, Tamil poet, teacher, and composer of Carnatic music.

Early life
Periyasamy was born to K. A. Palanivelappa Gounder and Paavaathal on 26 September 1908 at Manjakattuvalasu, near Modakurichi, in the Erode district of India. He was greatly influenced and inspired by the firebrand poet and revolutionary Subramania Bharathiyar, and Mahatma Gandhi. As a university student, he published an underground monthly magazine called Pithan containing incendiary articles that spoke out against the erstwhile British administration, in support of the Indian Independence Movement. This magazine was printed by K. M. Ramaswamy Gounder MLA in Gobichettipalayam initially. He also wrote poems and short stories during this period, adopting the pen name Thooran. He declined to sit for the final Bachelor of Arts examination, in protest of the execution of Bhagat Singh. Periyasamy gained his Bachelor of Arts degree (in Mathematics with a Minor in Astronomy) and a L.T. (Licentiate in Teaching) later. Periyasamy's background in Science would prove to be instrumental in helping him complete the Tamil Encyclopedia project, work on which began in 1947. He held that terms pertaining to science and technology were an integral part of the Tamil language.

Literary career
A prolific writer, he composed over six hundred songs on national, spiritual and moral issues. He wrote 'a poem a day' for several years after his daily poojas.  He became popular and the melody queens N. C. Vasanthakokilam and D. K. Pattammal always included his works in their concerts. A man with noble ideals, Thooran is an acknowledged poet and composer. Analogous to Tyagaraja's 'Santhamulekha, Soukyamuledhu' (set to Sama rāgam), Thooran's 'Santhamillamal sukham undo?' (Nattaikurinji) stresses that there is no joy without patience and no contentment amidst worries. Deep philosophical truths lay hidden in his simple devotional songs. Musical aesthetics and bhava find abundant evidence in his compositions.

While he was not a musician, he had profound poetic talents. Like Arunachala Kavirayar, he had to seek outside help to set his lyrics to music. Sivaramakrishna Iyer (who was born in 1913 in Mavelikara, Kerala and had joined Sri Ramakrishna Vidyalaya as music teacher in 1937) was his guru and choreographer. Thooran also availed of the services of senior musicians like K. V. Narayanaswamy, T.K. Govinda Rao and T. V. Sankaranarayanan.

Tiger Varadachariar, Musiri Subramania Iyer and Semmangudi Srinivasa Iyer are three of the eminent musicians who have spoken highly of his compositions. His popular compositions include Gananaathane (Saranga), Kaliyuga Varadhan (Brindavana Saranga), Muralidhara Gopala (Maand), Muruga Muruga (Saveri), Pazhani Nindra (Kapi), Punniyam Oru (Keeravani), Thottu Thottu (Padam in Bihag), and Thaye Thripurasundhari (Shuddha Saveri).

Contributions to Tamil literature
His songs were published in five volumes entitled 'Isai Mani Manjari'. Other publications include 'Thooran Stories' (1962), 'Nalla Nalla Paattu' (1965), 'Call of the Wild' and 'Bharati' for children, some of which were purchased by Tamil Isai Sangam.

He was Chief Editor from 1948 to 1978 of the Tamil Encyclopedia which ran to ten volumes. The credit for bringing out the first-ever Children's Encyclopaedia in Tamil in ten volumes goes to him.

Works
Poetry
Ilanthamizha
Minnal Poo
Nilap Pinju
Patti Paravaigal
Thooran Kavithaigal

Short story collections
Thanga Changili
Pillai Varam
Maavilakku
Kaalingarayan Kodai
Urimaip Penn
Thooran Ezhuthoviyangal

Essays
Thein Chittu
Poovin Sirippu
Kaattu Vazhithanile

Plays
Azhagu Mayakkam
Ponniyin Thyagam
Choozhchi
Ilan Thuravi
Aadhi Aththi
Manak Kugai
Kaadhalum Kadamaiyum

Books on psychology
Kuzanthai Ullam
Kuzanthai Manamum Athan Malarchiyum
Thazhvu Manappanmai
Adi Manam
Manamum Adhan Villakamum
Kumara Paruvam

Book on embryology
Karuvil Valarum Kuzhandhai

Books on genetics
Paarambariyam
Petror Kodutha Perung Kodai

Books for Children
Songs
Aanaiyum Poonaiyum
Nalla Nalla Pattu
Mazhalai Amudham
Animal and other stories
Natya Rani
Jimmy
Nila Paatti
Olai Kili
Thambiyin Thiramai
Kadakkitti Mudakkitti
Manjal Muttai
Other stories
Maaya Kallan
Soorap Puli
Kollimalai Kullan
Sangagiri Kottaiyin Marmam
Tharangambody Thangappudhaiyal
Aanaiyum Poonaiyum
Science
Parakkum Manidhan

Musical Compositions with Swara notations
Two Volumes published through Annamalai University containing 150 songs
Isai Mani Malai
Isai Mani Manjari
Murugan Arul Mani Maalai
Keerthanai Amudham

Folk Songs
Katril Vandha Kavithai

Translations from English to Tamil
Kanagathin Kural (Jack London's Call of the Wild)
Kadal Kadandha Natppu (Naomi Mitchison's Judy and Lakshmi)
Paravaigalaip Par (Jamal Aara's Watching Binds)

Editions
Bharathi Tamizh
Thakurin Aimperum Katturaigal

Published from palm-leaf manuscripts
Poet Kalamega's Chithira Madal, with annotations and explanatory notes
Vadivel Pillai's Mohini Vilasam
Avinashi Navalan's Thingalur Nonndi Nadakam

Books on Bharathi
Bharathi Noolagal Oru Thiranaivu
Bharathiyarin Nagaichuvaiyum, Naiyaandiyum.
Bharathiyum Ulagamum
Bharathiyum Kadavulum
Bharathiyum Samoogamum
Bharathiyum Thamizhagamum
Bharathiyum Paattum
Bharathiyum Paapaavum
Bharathiyum Pennmaiyum
Bharathiyum Bharatha Desamum

Compilation of Tamil Encyclopedia
General Encyclopedia, 10 Volumes
Children's Encyclopedia, 10 Volumes

Honours and titles
Padma Bhushan by President of India 1968
Isai Perarignar by Tamil Isai Sangam 1972
Kalaimamani by Tamil Nadu Iyal Isai Nataka Mandram 1970
Annamalai Chettiar Award by MAC Charities 1978

References

Thooran, Periasamy
Thooran, Periasamy
Thooran, Periasamy
Indian independence activists from Tamil Nadu
Thooran, Periasamy
Thooran, Periasamy
Thooran, Periasamy
Thooran, Periasamy
Carnatic composers
Indian encyclopedists
20th-century Indian poets
20th-century Indian composers
Indian male poets
Musicians from Tamil Nadu
Poets from Tamil Nadu
People from Erode district
20th-century Indian male writers